Ezra Warren Mudge  (December 5, 1811 – September 20, 1878) was a Massachusetts politician who served as the sixth Mayor of Lynn, Massachusetts.

Notes

Massachusetts city council members
Mayors of Lynn, Massachusetts
1811 births
1878 deaths
Members of the Massachusetts Governor's Council
Massachusetts Democrats
Massachusetts Republicans
19th-century American politicians